Air Commodore Alastair Cavendish Lindsay Mackie,  (3 August 1922 – 19 May 2018) was a senior officer in the Royal Air Force and later a campaigner for nuclear disarmament.

References

Further reading
 Mackie, Alastair. (2012) Flying Scot: An Airman's Story. Pen & Sword. 

1922 births
2018 deaths
Campaign for Nuclear Disarmament activists
Commanders of the Order of the British Empire
English autobiographers
Recipients of the Legion of Honour
People educated at Charterhouse School
People from Burley in Wharfedale
Recipients of the Commendation for Valuable Service in the Air
Recipients of the Distinguished Flying Cross (United Kingdom)
Royal Air Force officers
Royal Air Force pilots of World War II